Sir Cyril Stephen Cobb, KBE, MVO (1861 – 8 March 1938) was a British barrister and Conservative Party politician.

He was the son of J F Cobb of Margate, Kent. Following education at Newton Abbot, Devon and at Merton College, Oxford, he studied law. He was called to the bar at the Middle Temple in 1887.

In 1905 a by-election was held for a vacant London County Council seat at Fulham. Cobb was the candidate of the Conservative-backed Moderate Party, and succeeded in taking the seat from the majority Progressive Party. In 1907 the Moderates, reorganised as the Municipal Reform Party, gained control of the council. Cobb was to be a leading member of the authority for the next twenty-seven years, and was chairman in 1913 – 1914. He also served as chairman of the LCC's education committee. In 1934 the Labour Party gained control of the LCC, and Cobb lost his seat.

In the meantime, he had been elected to the Commons as Conservative Member of Parliament (MP) for Fulham West in 1918. He was briefly unseated at the 1929 general election, but regained the constituency at a by-election in the following year. He continued to represent Fulham West until his death.

He was made a member of the Royal Victorian Order in 1911 and a Knight of the Order of the British Empire in 1918. He also served as honorary secretary of St Saviour's Hospital, Regent's Park. He died at his London home in March 1938, aged 76.

References

External links 
 

Knights Commander of the Order of the British Empire
Members of the Royal Victorian Order
Members of London County Council
Conservative Party (UK) MPs for English constituencies
1861 births
1938 deaths
Alumni of Merton College, Oxford
Councillors in Greater London
Members of the Middle Temple
UK MPs 1918–1922
UK MPs 1922–1923
UK MPs 1923–1924
UK MPs 1924–1929
UK MPs 1929–1931
UK MPs 1931–1935
UK MPs 1935–1945
Municipal Reform Party politicians